The Battle of Yaunis Khan, also known as the Battle of Khan Yunis, was fought on October 28, 1516 between the Ottoman Empire and the Mamluk Sultanate. The Mamluk cavalry forces led by Janbirdi al-Ghazali attacked the Ottomans that were trying to cross Gaza on their way to Egypt. The Ottomans, led by Grand Vizier Hadım Sinan Pasha, were able to break the Egyptian Mamluk cavalry charge. Al-Ghazali was wounded during the confrontation, and the left-over Mamluk forces and their commander Al-Ghazali retreated to Cairo.

References

Yaunis Khan
Yaunis Khan
History of the Gaza Strip
Yaunis
1516 in the Ottoman Empire
1516 in Africa
1510s in Egypt
Khan Yunis
1516 in the Mamluk Sultanate